Helmut Wechselberger (born 12 February 1953) is an Austrian racing cyclist. He won the 1988 Tour de Suisse. He also competed in the individual road race and the team time trial events at the 1984 Summer Olympics. He won the Austrian National Road Race Championships in 1984.

References

External links 

1953 births
Living people
Austrian male cyclists
Cyclists at the 1984 Summer Olympics
Olympic cyclists of Austria
20th-century Austrian people